Christopher T. Trakel. is an American politician serving as a member of the Idaho Senate for the 11th district. He assumed office on December 1, 2022.

Early life and education
Trakel was born in Boise, Idaho, and graduated from Meridian High School in 2000.

Career
In March 2001, Trakel enlisted in the United States Marine Corps as a rifleman. Trakel was deployed to Iraq with the 2nd Battalion, 7th Marines and Afghanistan with the 2nd Battalion, 4th Marines before retiring in 2016 as a staff sergeant. Trakel later moved to Caldwell, Idaho, and founded a woodworking business. He was elected to the Idaho Senate in November 2022.

References

Living people
Republican Party Idaho state senators
People from Boise, Idaho
People from Meridian, Idaho
People from Caldwell, Idaho
People from Ada County, Idaho
People from Canyon County, Idaho
Year of birth missing (living people)
United States Marine Corps non-commissioned officers
United States Marine Corps personnel of the Iraq War
United States Marine Corps personnel of the War in Afghanistan (2001–2021)